London Buses route 108 is a Transport for London contracted bus route in London, England. Running between Lewisham and Stratford International station, it is operated by London Central. An unusual feature of the route is its use of the Blackwall Tunnel, a source of severe delays which leads to the route often being cited as amongst the least reliable in London.

History

Two batches of double deck buses were specifically built for use in the Blackwall and Rotherhithe Tunnels, with specially shaped roofs to improve clearance on the corners. On 14 April 1937, the last solid-tyred AEC NS-Type bus in London operated on route 108. In 1937, forty STL-type buses with convex-shaped roofs made with Blackwall Tunnel in mind were used on routes 108 and 82 and allocated to Athol Street (C) garage in Poplar.

Harris Bus ran into financial difficulties in December 1999, and as a result operations of its contracted routes were taken over by a new subsidiary of London Buses itself, trading as East Thames Buses. East Thames Buses initially ran its routes north of the Thames from the former London Forest garage in Ash Grove, along with the Harris base at Belvedere.

On Friday, 6 Sept 1968, RTL 1561 was the last RTL southbound through the 1897 Blackwall Tunnel bore from Bromley By Bow to Lower Sydenham and back via the 1968 bore of Blackwall Tunnel. RTL1561 was also the last RTL on Route 108 before conversion to RT' from 7 Sept 1968. 

Route 108 became the first bus route to serve the Millennium Dome at the Greenwich Peninsula during construction. The stop was initially inside the security area, and was used by staff only.

On 3 October 2009, East Thames Buses was sold to London General, which included a five-year contract to operate route 108. Increased capacity will be introduced on route 108 in 2014.

In February 2016, Transport for London released a consultation regarding various changes on local bus services in Poplar and the Isle of Dogs. One of these changes saw route 108 swap routes between All Saints and Bow with route D8 and extended to terminate at Stratford International station in lieu of Stratford bus station from 1 October 2016 with it no longer serving Bromley-by-Bow and South Bromley. Mercedes-Benz Citaros and two electric Irizar i2es cascaded from routes 507 and 521 were introduced at the same time.

Current route
Route 108 operates via these primary locations:
Lewisham station  
Blackheath station 
Blackheath Royal Standard
Westcombe Park station 
Greenwich Peninsula Millennium Village/Oval Square
North Greenwich bus station  for North Greenwich station 
Poplar Bazely Street
Langdon Park DLR station 
Bow Common Cranwell Close
Devons Road DLR station 
Bow Church DLR station  
London Aquatics Centre
Stratford City bus station  for Stratford station     
Stratford International station

References

External links 

 Timetable

Bus routes in London
Transport in the London Borough of Newham
Transport in the London Borough of Tower Hamlets
Transport in the Royal Borough of Greenwich
Transport in the London Borough of Lewisham